Gisele Ishimwe (born 9 September 2004) is a Rwandan cricketer who plays for the women's national cricket team as an all-rounder.

A right-arm medium pace bowler and right handed batter, Ishimwe scored a Women's Twenty20 International (WT20I) century for the national team in September 2021. More recently, in January 2023, she led the Under-19 team to victories against two ICC Full Member teams during the 2023 ICC Under-19 Women's T20 World Cup, and was player of the match in both matches.

See also 
 List of centuries in women's Twenty20 International cricket
 List of Rwanda women Twenty20 International cricketers

References

Further reading

External links 
 

Living people
2004 births
Rwanda women Twenty20 International cricketers
Rwandan women cricketers